Events from the year 1912 in Scotland.

Incumbents 

 Secretary for Scotland and Keeper of the Great Seal – John Sinclair, 1st Baron Pentland until 13 February; then Thomas McKinnon Wood

Law officers 
 Lord Advocate – Alexander Ure
 Solicitor General for Scotland – Andrew Anderson

Judiciary 
 Lord President of the Court of Session and Lord Justice General – Lord Dunedin
 Lord Justice Clerk – Lord Kingsburgh
 Chairman of the Scottish Land Court, established on 1 April – Lord Kennedy

Events 
 15 January – Rua Reidh Lighthouse first lit on Rubh'Re Point near the entrance to Loch Ewe.
 May – Unionist Party emerges in Scotland following merger of the Liberal Unionist Party into the Conservative And Unionist Party in England.
 Summer – The last residents leave the Hebridean isle of Mingulay.
 August – Sir Fitzroy Maclean, 10th Baronet, takes possession of the family seat of Duart Castle on the Isle of Mull.
 10 September – Midlothian by-election. The Unionist Party gain the seat from the Liberal Party.
 24 October – Formation of the Edinburgh and Leith Branch of the Workers' Educational Association at a meeting addressed by Albert Mansbridge.
 26 November – A severe south-westerly gale hits Scotland: ten people are killed and Troon is heavily flooded.
 The island of Raasay is acquired by Baird & Co. who open an iron ore mine there.

Births 
 1 January – Margot Bennett, novelist (died 1980)
 10 February – Ena Lamont Stewart, playwright (died 2006)
 15 February – Jane Lee, silent film child actor (possible location) (died 1957 in New York City)
 17 March – Alex Hastings, international footballer (died 1988)
 10 April – Archie McKellar, squadron leader, flying ace of the Royal Air Force during World War II (killed in action 1940 over Adisham, Kent)
 16 April – David Langton, born Basil Muir Langton-Dodds, actor (died 1994 in Stratford-upon-Avon)
 18 April – Sir Sandy Glen, explorer of the Arctic and wartime intelligence officer (died 2004)
 10 May – Mary Anne MacLeod Trump, mother of President of the United States Donald Trump (died 2000 in New York City)
 3 June – William Douglas-Home, playwright (died 1992 in England)
 15 August – Sir Monty Finniston, industrialist (died 1991 in London)
 2 September – David Daiches, literary historian and literary critic (died 2005)
 11 September – Robin Jenkins, novelist (died 2005)
 12 September – J. F. Hendry, poet (died 1986 in Canada)
 21 September – Sir Ian MacGregor, industrialist (died 1998 in England)
 29 November – Muriel Gibson, Scottish nationalist activist and military officer (died 2005)
 1 December – Margaret Campbell, Duchess of Argyll, née Whigham, socialite (died 1993 in England)

Deaths 
 18 February – George Henderson, scholar of Scottish Gaelic (born 1866) 
 29 March – Henry Robertson Bowers, polar explorer (born 1883) 
 15 April – Wreck of the RMS Titanic
 William McMaster Murdoch, First Officer on RMS Titanic (born 1873) 
 6 June – Alexander Carmichael, exciseman, folklorist, antiquarian and author (born 1832) 
 20 July – Andrew Lang, poet, novelist, literary critic and contributor to anthropology (born 1844) 
 8 November – Dugald Drummond, steam locomotive engineer (born 1840)
 25 November – Sir Edward Moss, theatrical impresario (born 1852 in Manchester)
 18 December – Alexander Taylor Innes, lawyer, writer, biographer and church historian (born 1833)

The arts
 The Hippodrome Cinema, Bo'ness, opens its doors. It will be the first purpose-built cinema in Scotland to celebrate its centenary as a film venue.
 Bandmaster Frederick J. Ricketts of the Argyll and Sutherland Highlanders publishes "Holyrood", the first march under the pseudonym Kenneth J. Alford.

See also 
 Timeline of Scottish history
 1912 in the United Kingdom

References 

 
Scotland
Years of the 20th century in Scotland
1910s in Scotland